William Ellery Channing II (November 29, 1817 – December 23, 1901) was an American Transcendentalist poet, nephew and namesake of the Unitarian preacher Dr. William Ellery Channing. His uncle was usually known as "Dr. Channing", while the nephew was commonly called "Ellery Channing", in print. The younger Ellery Channing was thought brilliant but undisciplined by many of his contemporaries. Amos Bronson Alcott famously said of him in 1871, "Whim, thy name is Channing."  Nevertheless, the Transcendentalists thought his poetry among the best of their group's literary products.

Life and work
Channing was born in Boston, Massachusetts to Dr. Walter Channing, a physician and Harvard Medical School professor. He attended Boston Latin School and later the Round Hill School in Northampton, Massachusetts, then entered Harvard University in 1834, but did not graduate. In 1839 he lived for some months in Woodstock, Illinois in a log hut that he built; in 1840 he moved to Cincinnati. In the fall of 1842 he married Ellen Fuller, the younger sister of transcendentalist Margaret Fuller and they began their married life in Concord, Massachusetts where they lived a half-mile north of The Old Manse as Nathaniel Hawthorne's neighbor.

Channing wrote to Thoreau in a letter: "I see nothing for you on this earth but that field which I once christened 'Briars'; go out upon that, build yourself a hut, and there begin the grand process of devouring yourself alive. I see no alternative, no other hope for you." Thoreau adopted this advice, and shortly after built his famous dwelling beside Walden Pond. Some speculation identifies Channing as the "Poet" of Thoreau's Walden; the two were frequent walking companions.

In 1843 he moved to a hill-top in Concord, some distance from the village, and published his first volume of poems, reprinting several from The Dial. Thoreau called his literary style "sublimo-slipshod". The printing of a compilation of these poems was subsidized by Samuel Gray Ward.

In 1844–1845, Channing separated from his family and restarted his wandering, unanchored life. He first spent some months in New York City as a writer for the Tribune, after which he made a journey to Europe for several months. In 1846 he returned to Concord and lived alone on the main street, opposite the house occupied by the Thoreau family and then by Alcott. During much of this time he had no fixed occupation, though for a while, in 1855–1856, he was one of the editors of the New Bedford Mercury. After enumerating his various wanderings, places of residence, and rare intervals of employment, his housemate Franklin Benjamin Sanborn wrote of him:

In 1873, Channing was the first biographer of Thoreau, publishing Thoreau, the Poet-Naturalist.

When visiting the Emersons in 1876, the young poet Emma Lazarus met Channing and accompanied him on a tour of some of the places Thoreau had loved, stating in her journal in regard to the friendship between Thoreau and Channing that

Channing gave Henry Thoreau's compass to Emma Lazarus.

Death

Channing died December 23, 1901 in Concord, at the home of Franklin Benjamin Sanborn, where he had spent the final ten years of his life. He is buried at Sleepy Hollow Cemetery, Concord on Authors' Ridge directly facing his longtime friend Thoreau. Frank Sanborn paid for Channing's burial plot.

In a July 19, 1902, Springfield Republican article, Frank Sanborn states,

In a later Republican column, Sanborn informs:

Criticism
Critic Edgar Allan Poe was particularly harsh in reviewing Channing's poetry in a series of articles titled "Our Amateur Poets" published in Graham's Magazine in 1843. He wrote, "It may be said in his favor that nobody ever heard of him. Like an honest woman, he has always succeeded in keeping himself from being made the subject of gossip". A critic for the Daily Forum in Philadelphia agreed with Poe, though he was surprised Poe bothered reviewing Channing at all. He wrote:

Mr. Poe, the most hyper-critical writer of this meridian, cuts the poetry of William Ellery Channing Junior, if not into inches, at least into feet. Mr. C's poetry is very trashy, and we should as soon expect to hear Bryant writing sonnets on a lollypop as to see Mr. Poe gravely attempt to criticize the volume.

Nathaniel Hawthorne metaphorically appraised Channing's oeuvre as of particularly high quality, if uneven, in the short story "Earth's Holocaust".

Notes

References

External links

 Manuscript Collection with a brief Channing biography from the Concord Free Public Libraries
 Ellery Channing Remembers Henry Thoreau
 

1817 births
1901 deaths
19th-century American poets
19th-century American male writers
American male poets
American people of English descent
People from Concord, Massachusetts
People from Woodstock, Illinois
Writers from Boston